Operation Karbala 10 was a joint effort by Iran and Kurdish PUK rebels in Iraq. 

Wanting revenge after their failed attempt to besiege Basra, the Iranians launched Operation Karbala 10 in northern Iraq on 14 April. They wanted to show the Iraqis the strength of their army, however the Iranians supported by a few thousand PUK Peshmergas succeeded to capture the outskirts of Sulaymaniyah and Halabja and succeeded in taking very minimal square kilometres of insignificant lands around them.

References 

 History of Iran: Iran-Iraq War 1980-1988, Iran Chamber Society

Operations Karbala
Karbala-Ten